Life on Mars is a British television drama series, produced by Kudos Film & Television for the BBC in 2006 and 2007. The transmission dates given below refer to the original UK showings on the BBC — for the first series in 2006 all episodes premiered on BBC One, but for the second series in 2007 two of the episodes had their first showing on the digital television channel BBC Four. For these episodes, both the BBC Four and BBC One premiere dates are given.

Series overview

DVD releases
The following DVD sets have been released by Acorn Media UK.

Episodes

Series One (2006)
The first series of Life On Mars focuses on Sam's life following the crash and his arrival in 1973. Elements are thrown in to variously suggest that he is mad, in a coma, or has actually travelled back in time. Also during the first series run, Sam is informed that he is DI (Detective Inspector) to DCI Gene Hunt and the rest of the CID department in Manchester in 1973. This revelation is something that Sam finds hard to understand; he spends most of the series working alone, against his team and Gene.

Series Two (2007)

As noted below, episodes two and three of Series Two were shown on digital television channel BBC Four a week before they were aired on BBC One. These advance airings took place at 10pm on Tuesday 13 February 2007 and Tuesday 20 February 2007, immediately following the airing of the previous episode on BBC One.

On Tuesday 27 February 2007, episode three was preempted from its planned airing on BBC One by a football match (the unplanned-for FA Cup fifth round replay between Manchester United and Reading), and the 10pm airing on BBC Four featured a repeat of the first episode of the series. When episode three was finally aired on BBC One on Tuesday 6 March 2007, another repeated episode followed at 10pm on BBC Four. The Series 2 page on BBC's Life On Mars microsite now includes the sub-heading "Catch up on Series 2 every Tuesday, 10pm, BBC Four", indicating that the advance airings have been scrapped in favour of repeats; resulting in an episode airing on BBC One being immediately followed by the previous episode on BBC Four, and one episode (the third) being aired in three consecutive weeks.

References

External links
Series one episode guide at bbc.co.uk.
Series two episode guide at bbc.co.uk.
Series one, episode one shooting script at BBC Writers Room.

Lists of British crime television series episodes
Lists of British science fiction television series episodes
Episodes, Life on Mars (UK)
Television episodes about time travel